The United States Marijuana Party (officially the U.S. Marijuana Party) is a cannabis political party in the United States founded in 2002 by Loretta Nall specifically to end the war on drugs and to legalize cannabis. Their policies also include other socially libertarian positions. U.S. Marijuana Party candidates in Vermont have run campaigns as recently as 2016. The party has had local chapters in several other states, and has been affiliated with international cannabis political parties.

2012 presidential election 
On September 18, 2012, the U.S. Marijuana Party  endorsed Libertarian Party candidate Gary Johnson in the 2012 presidential election.

History 

The United States Marijuana Party was started in 2002 by Loretta Nall from Massachusetts following her misdemeanor arrest for marijuana possession. Nall was the chairwomen of the party until she resigned in 2004 to pursue the Libertarian Party of Alabama's nomination for governor.

Colorado 

In Colorado, Wayward Bill Chengelis was U.S. Marijuana Party chairman for many years, until Chengelis’ death in 2021.

Illinois 
In 2004, Illinois Marijuana Party leader Richard Rawlings ran for U.S. Congress in Illinois' 18th Congressional District as a write-in candidate. Brian Meyer ran as a write-in candidate in the 12th Congressional District in 2004. Rawlings ran again as a Marijuana Party write-in candidate for Congress in 2010.

Nebraska 
In 2015–2016, Zach Boiko, Mark Elworth Jr., and Krystal Gabel collected signatures for Marijuana Party of Nebraska to be officially recognized. In order to make the ballot, petitioners needed 5,397 signatures statewide. The party also must have a certain number of signatures from each of the state's three congressional districts.

In July, 2016, volunteers turned in 9,000 signatures to the Nebraska Secretary of State. However, the Secretary of State said that half of the signatures were invalid, falling short of the 5,397 needed. In 2016, the group changed its name to Nebraska Legal Marijuana NOW Party, and organizers began petitioning for 2018 ballot access.

New Jersey 
Rastafari cannabis rights activist and businessman Edward Forchion, who founded the Legalize Marijuana Party in 1998 in New Jersey, ran for U.S. Representative for New Jersey's 3rd congressional district in 2004 as a U.S. Marijuana Party candidate. Forchion got 4,914 votes.

Results in federal elections

Vermont 

Independent candidate Cris Ericson ran for Governor of Vermont in 2002 as a Make Marijuana Legal candidate. In 2004, Ericson ran for Vermont governor and U.S. senator as a Marijuana Party candidate. She went on to compete in 2006, 2008, 2014 and 2016 in Republican Party and Democratic Party primaries, and for multiple state and federal offices as an Independent candidate. Ericson was a U.S. Marijuana Party candidate for U.S. Senator and Governor of Vermont in 2010, 2012, and 2016. Cris Ericson left the marijuana party in January 2018.

Results in gubernatorial elections

Results in Vermont state elections

Results in federal elections

Washington 
In the Washington State House of Representatives District 2b election, in 2014, retired union official Rick Payne was on the August primary ballot as a Marijuana Party candidate. In Washington the top two vote-getters in the primary advance to the general election. Payne received 1,644 votes (9.3%). Defeated by the incumbent, a Republican, and a Libertarian candidate, Payne did not make it into the November general election.

See also 
 Cannabis political parties of the United States
 List of political parties in the United States

References

External links 
 Official website

State chapters 
 COLORADO William A. Chengelis
 PENNSYLVANIA Tom Johnson
 KENTUCKY Sheree Krider
 ILLINOIS Richard J. Rawlings
 MARYLAND Chris Hirsh

Cannabis political parties of the United States
Political parties established in 2002
Libertarian parties in the United States
Political parties in the United States
2002 establishments in the United States
2002 in cannabis